Pareinma Shin Mingaung ("Usurper Mingaung of Pareinma") is one of 37 nats in the official Burmese pantheon of nats. He was King Kyiso of Pagan, and brother of Anawrahta. He was accidentally killed by a hunter's arrow while hunting deer.

References

30